is a Japanese former sports shooter. He competed in the 50 metre rifle, prone event at the 1968 Summer Olympics.

References

1943 births
Living people
Japanese male sport shooters
Olympic shooters of Japan
Shooters at the 1968 Summer Olympics
Sportspeople from Tokyo